Tyler Medeiros (born July 11, 1995) is a Canadian singer, songwriter, and dancer.

Personal life
Medeiros was born and grew up in Toronto, Ontario, to a Portuguese father and an Italian mother. Tyler Medeiros attended St. Anthony's Catholic Elementary School located in Toronto from Junior Kindergarten until he graduated grade 8 in 2009. Tyler Medeiros is the cousin of singers Shawn Desman and Danny Fernandes. In 2012 Tyler was signed by Flo Rida, also he went on a Canadian Tour with Victoria Duffield, Cody Simpson and Big Time Rush.

He began taking dancing lessons at the age of ten. He was signed to CP Records in 2010.
Today, he sometimes resides in Los Angeles to further his career.

Musical career
Medeiros' first single was "Girlfriend" featuring labelmate and cousin Danny Fernandes. The video premiered on Family Channel and also MuchMusic. It was followed up with his second single "Say I Love You (Please Don't Go)" that features rapper Lil Twist sampling on a KC and the Sunshine Band song. Both videos were directed by Marc André Debruyne. Medeiros also appeared on the cover of July–August 2011 issue of the Canadian teen magazine Vervegirl. Tyler was chosen my Family Channel to sing and perform the theme song to their 2011 Bullying Awareness Week Stand Up! campaign. The song, called "What's Up, Stand Up," was written by RyanDan members Ryan Kowarsky and Dan Kowarsky as well as Maks Gabriel. The video premiered on the Family Channel on November 15, 2011.

In 2012 Medeiros signed with Flo Rida's IMG Label in a joint project with CP Records. Shortly after the signing, he joined Flo Rida and Pitbull for the Planet Pit Tour across Canada. On June 1, 2012, it was announced that Medeiros would be a main performer at the Big Ticket Summer Concert put on by Family Channel on August 26 along with Bridgit Mendler, R5, Veronica and Allstar Weekend. In June 2012 it was also announced that Tyler would join Big Time Rush and Cody Simpson on a cross Canada tour in September. September 4, the tour kick off in Montreal coincided with Medeiros release of TM – his debut EP.

The first song off TM was "#QTEEs" and the second was "Radio" ft. Flo Rida.

Discography

EPs
2012: TM (EP)

Singles

Videography
2010: "Girlfriend" (feat. Danny Fernandes)
2011: "Say I Love You (Please Don't Go)" (feat. Lil Twist)

References

External links
Tyler Medeiros Official Website

1995 births
Living people
21st-century Canadian male singers
Canadian male dancers
Canadian male singers
Canadian people of Italian descent
Canadian people of Portuguese descent
Musicians from Toronto